Claire Brady may refer to:
 Claire Brady (athlete), Irish runner
 Claire Brady (Days of Our Lives), a character on Days of Our Lives